Karel Štark (born 25 February 1942) is a former Czech cyclist. He competed in the men's tandem  at the 1964 Summer Olympics.

References

1942 births
Living people
Czech male cyclists
Olympic cyclists of Czechoslovakia
Cyclists at the 1964 Summer Olympics
Sportspeople from Plzeň